Hans Gruber (4 June 1905 – 9 October 1967) was a German international footballer. He was part of Germany's team at the 1928 Summer Olympics, but he did not play in any matches.

References

1905 births
1967 deaths
Association football midfielders
German footballers
Germany international footballers
Olympic footballers of Germany
Footballers at the 1928 Summer Olympics